Samthar State was a princely state in India during the British Raj. The state was administered as part of the Bundelkhand Agency of Central India. The state was ruled by Khatana clan of Gurjars. Its capital was Samthar town, located in a level plain in the Bundelkhand region crossed by the Pahuj and the Betwa rivers. 

The founder was Ranjith Singh Khatana belong to Gurjar community who in 1760, profiting from the troubled times of the Maratha invasion, proclaimed his state independent and was acknowledged as a Raja by the Marathas. In 1817 Samthar was recognized as a state by the British
.They received a sanad of adoption in 1862. In 1884 the state had to cede some territories for the construction of the railways.

Rulers 
The ruling dynasty were Gurjars of the Khatana clan and had the right to an 11 [[gun salute]]

Other 
 Jhansi District

References

Princely states of Bundelkhand
Jhansi district
Gurjar
Princely states of Uttar Pradesh